The white-tipped plantcutter (Phytotoma rutila) is a species of bird in the family Cotingidae. As the other plantcutters, this species is sexually dimorphic and folivorous. It is found widely in woodland and scrub of south-eastern and south-central South America. It is mainly found in lowlands east of the Andes, and ranges well into the highlands in Bolivia.

References

white-tipped plantcutter
Birds of Argentina
Birds of Bolivia
Birds of Uruguay
white-tipped plantcutter
Taxa named by Louis Jean Pierre Vieillot
Taxonomy articles created by Polbot